Five Smokin' Tracks from Lit is an EP by the rock band Lit. It was released on December 10, 1996 on the Malicious Vinyl label.

Track listing

Personnel
A Jay Popoff – vocals
Jeremy Popoff – guitar
Kevin Baldes – bass
Allen Shellenberger – drums

Production
Produced by Lit and Matt Gruber
Recorded and mixed by Matt Gruber
Recorded at Grand Master and HollywoodSound
Mixed at Scream and HollywoodSound
2nd Engineers: Todd Burke, Bruan Davis, and Ralph Cacciaurri
2nd Mix Engineers: Ryan Boesch and Doug Trantow
Assisted by Josh Turner
Back Cover Photo: Jeff Bender
Cadillac Photo: Glen Laferman
Design: StudioSee

References

Lit (band) albums
1996 EPs